The women's shot put competition at the 2016 Summer Olympics in Rio de Janeiro, Brazil. The event was held at the Olympic Stadium on 12 August. Each athlete receives three throws in the qualifying round. All who achieve the qualifying distance progress to the final. If less than twelve athletes achieve this mark, then the twelve furthest throwing athletes reach the final. Each finalist is allowed three throws in last round, with the top eight athletes after that point being given three further attempts.

Summary
Valerie Adams entered as the defending Olympic champion from 2012 (initial champion Nadzeya Ostapchuk remained banned for doping). Adams had regained form, ranking second in the world with 20.19 m, after two injury affected seasons. Christina Schwanitz had won the 2015 World Championships in her absence and had taken gold at the European Championships the previous month with a throw of 20.17 m. Gong Lijiao (the 2015 world runner-up) led the rankings at 20.43 m. Michelle Carter, who had won World Indoor and American titles that year, was the only other woman to have thrown beyond twenty metres that year.

In the qualifying round, Adams was best with her only throw of 19.74 m, while Schwanitz and Carter also went beyond nineteen metres, though Carter took two attempts to get the automatic qualifier. Gong, Anita Márton, and Raven Saunders were the other automatic qualifiers. American Felisha Johnson, who was eighth on the season's lists, was the most prominent athlete who failed to progress to the final.

In the final, Valerie Adams looked set to claim a third straight title.  She took the lead after the first round with a 19.79 m and improved her position with a throw of 20.42 m in the second round. Carter sat in second position through all the rounds of the competition with a 19.12 m in the first and 19.82 m in the second (which only briefly held the lead until Adams could throw again). Schwanitz held the bronze medal position in the first round, but was overtaken by Gong in the second.  Márton equalled Gong with a third round 19.39, but was still behind on the tiebreaker.  In the final round Márton threw a Hungarian record 19.87 m to take over bronze medal position, equalling Carter's best at that point but still down due to the tie breaking second throw. In the final round Carter delivered an unexpected American record of a whopping distance of 20.63 m to take the lead. In the last throw of the competition Adams went beyond twenty metres again but her mark of 20.39 m came up short and Carter succeeded her to the title.

The medals were presented by Barry Maister, IOC member, New Zealand and Geoffrey Gardner, Council Member of the IAAF.

Schedule

All times are Brasília Time (UTC−3).

Records
, the existing World and Olympic records were as follows.

The following record was established during the competition:

The following national records were established during the competition:

Results

Qualification

Qualification rule: qualification standard 18.40m (Q) or at least best 12 qualified (q).

Final

References

Women's shot put
2016
2016 in women's athletics
Women's events at the 2016 Summer Olympics